Dermatopsis is a genus of viviparous brotulas.

Species
There are currently four recognized species in this genus:
 Dermatopsis greenfieldi Møller & Schwarzhans, 2006 (Greenfield's mudbrotula)
 Dermatopsis hoesei Møller & Schwarzhans, 2006 (Hoese's mudbrotula)
 Dermatopsis joergennielseni Møller & Schwarzhans, 2006 (Nielsen's mudbrotula)
 Dermatopsis macrodon Ogilby, 1896 (Fleshfish)

References

Bythitidae